The FIS Alpine World Ski Championships 1938 in alpine skiing were the eighth edition of the competition, organized by the International Ski Federation (FIS), and were held in Engelberg, Switzerland in February 1938. Due to the "Anschluss", participants from Austria (male and female) were included in the Deutsche Reich team.

Medal summary

Men's events

Women's events

Medal table

References

1938 in alpine skiing
1938 in Swiss sport
1938
International sports competitions hosted by Switzerland
Alpine skiing competitions in France
March 1938 sports events
Engelberg